Richard William McDaid (born 3 November 1975) is an Irish cricketer. McDaid is a right-handed batsman who bowls right-arm medium pace.

McDaid played two first-class matches for the Ireland cricket team in 1999, both coming against the South Africa Academy.  McDaid took 2 wickets at a bowling average of 76.50, with best figures of 1/34.  He represented Ireland in 16 other matches from 1999 to 2002.

McDaid continues to play club cricket for Limavady Cricket and Rugby Club, Northern Ireland.

References

External links
Richard McDaid at Cricinfo
Richard McDaid at CricketArchive

1975 births
Living people
Sportspeople from Derry (city)
Cricketers from Northern Ireland
Irish cricketers